Andrew Michael Faulkner (born September 12, 1992) is an American former professional baseball pitcher. He has played in Major League Baseball (MLB) for the Texas Rangers.

Career

Texas Rangers
Faulkner was drafted by the Texas Rangers in the 14th round of the 2011 Major League Baseball Draft out of South Aiken High School in Aiken, South Carolina. He signed with the Rangers and made his professional debut with the Arizona League Rangers. In 2012 and 2013 he played for the Hickory Crawdads. Faulkner started 2014 with the Myrtle Beach Pelicans and was promoted to the Double-A Frisco RoughRiders in August.

Faulkner was promoted to the majors on August 28, 2015.

Baltimore Orioles
Faulker was traded to the Baltimore Orioles on April 6, 2017. He elected free agency on November 6, 2017, and signed a minor league contract with Baltimore on December 22. He elected free agency on November 3, 2018.

Los Angeles Dodgers
On February 15, 2019, Faulker signed a minor league deal with the Los Angeles Dodgers. He was released on June 18, 2019, without appearing in a single game.

Diablos Rojos del México
On June 19, 2019, Faulkner signed with the Diablos Rojos del México of the Mexican League. He was released on December 19, 2019.

References

External links

1992 births
Living people
Sportspeople from Aiken, South Carolina
Baseball players from South Carolina
Major League Baseball pitchers
American expatriate baseball players in Mexico
Texas Rangers players
Arizona League Rangers players
Hickory Crawdads players
Myrtle Beach Pelicans players
Frisco RoughRiders players
Round Rock Express players
Surprise Saguaros players
Norfolk Tides players
Diablos Rojos del México players
People from Bamberg, South Carolina